NK Dugopolje is a professional Croatian football club based in the town of Dugopolje on the outskirts of Split, a city on the Adriatic coast. They were founded in 1952, and they currently play in the Prva nogometna liga (English: First football league), commonly Prva NL or 1. NL, is the second tier of the football league system in Croatia.

History

The club was founded in 1952 as NK Proleter.

The 2009–10 season was a successful one for Dugopolje as they finished top of the 3. HNL South and were promoted to the Croatian Second Football League. In their first season in the second division of Croatian football, Dugopolje finished eighth out of a total of 16 teams. In the following season, Dugopolje finished first, qualifying for promotion to the Prva HNL, the first division of football in Croatia, but were denied a licence for the top division due to numerous issues and remained in the second league. The 2012–13 season witnessed a large restructuring of football in Croatia during which 7 out of 16 teams were to be relegated to accommodate for a reduction in the number of contestants in the 1st division from 16 to 12. Dugopolje prevailed, finishing 8th, two places clear of relegation. In the 2013–14 season, with a reduced number of teams in the top and second division, the competition was much stronger than previously and Dugopolje struggled and barely avoided relegation.

Dugopolje fell into financial trouble in 2018 due to lower funding from the municipality. A Brazilian business consortium offered an investment, but was rejected by the club's board.

Stadium 

Since 2009, Dugopolje host their home matches at the newly built Stadion Hrvatski vitezovi, with a capacity of 5,200. The stadium meets strict UEFA standards and holds a licence for UEFA competitions.

Recent seasons

Current squad

References

Association football clubs established in 1952
Football clubs in Croatia
Football clubs in Split-Dalmatia County
1952 establishments in Croatia